The Insurgency in Meghalaya is a frozen armed conflict between India and a number of separatist rebel groups which was taking place in the state of Meghalaya. The Insurgency in Meghalaya is part of the wider Insurgency in Northeast India, and was fueled by demands of the Khasi, Synteng and Garo people for a separate state.

Background
The state of Meghalaya was separated from the state of Assam in 1971, in order to satisfy the Khasi, Jaintia and Garo for a separate state. The decision was initially praised as an example of successful national integration into the wider Indian state. 

This, however, failed to prevent the rise of national consciousness among the local tribal populations. This later led to a direct confrontation between Indian nationalism and the newly created Garo and Khasi nationalisms. A parallel rise of nationalism in the other members of the Seven Sister States further complicated the situation, resulting in occasional clashes between fellow rebel groups.

The state wealth distribution system further fueled the rising separatist movements, as funding is practiced through per capita transfers, which largely benefits the leading ethnic group.

The first militant outfit to emerge in the region was the Hynniewtrep Achik Liberation Council (HALC), it was formed in 1992, aiming to protect the interests of Meghalaya's indigenous population from the rise of non-tribal ("Dkhar")  immigration.

A conflict of interest soon led to a split of HALC into the Garo dominated Achik Matgrik Liberation Army (AMLA), and the joint Systeng-Khasi alliance of Hynniewtrep National Liberation Council (HNLC). However AMLA passed into obscurity, while Achik National Volunteers Council (ANVC) took its place. The Garo – Khasi drift persisted as HNLC had set up the goal of turning Meghalaya into an exclusively Khasi region, ANVC on the other hand sought out the creation of an independent state in the Garo Hills. A small group of Jaintia region who is being claimed a separate state in the name of historical kingdom of "Jaintia Rajya".

A number of non Meghalayan separatist groups have also operated in the region, including the United Liberation Front of Assam and the National Democratic Front of Bodoland among others.

After Mass surrender and disbandment of ULFA and NDFB, insurgency in meghalaya has been finished for good. Most major Garo militants have also either been killed or have surrendered.

Timeline

On 9 September 2002, ANVC militants kill 6 policemen, after laying an ambush in the vicinity of Chokpot.

On 26 September 2003, Indian troops kill 8 ANVC militants in two separate encounters, in the West Garo Hills district.

On 23 July 2004, ANVC signed an extended ceasefire agreement with the Indian government, while maintaining low level activity. A power vacuum created by the ceasefire lead to the creation of several rebel groups, including RIUF, UANF, HULA, HNSRA.

On 24 July 2007, HNLC chairman Julius Dorphang surrendered to the authorities after abandoning the faction's camp in the  Maulvi Bazar district of Bangladesh, four other rebels accompanied Dorphang in his decision.

On 12 October 2008, policemen shot and killed top PLF-M commander Pollendro Marak, in the aftermath of an encounter in the area of the Boganol village, East Garo Hills.

On 10 December 2010, four GNLA rebels were killed five were detained in a clash with police officers that took place in the East Garo Hills district.

On 5 April 2011, GNLA killed 5 migrant coal miners and injured another in the Goka coal dumping area South Garo Hills district.

On 9 August 2011, 4 GNLA militants were slain, including a senior commander, following a police operation. The events took place in the Bolkengre village, East Khasi Hills district.

On 9 August 2012, security forces arrested 5 GNLA separatists in Resubelpara, North Garo Hills district, as the militants were extorting money from a local citizen.

On 2 April 2014, the UALA, ASAK, LAEF, ANLCA and ANCA militant factions united under the name of A’chik Revolutionary Front, the group aims to create a separate Garoland State in the Garo Hills area.

On 1 May 2014, a GNLA training officer was killed in the aftermath of an army raid on a GNLA camp in the area of Chokpot, IED and communication equipment was also confiscated. A heavily injured UALA cadre was detained in a separate incident.

On 20 May 2014, in the aftermath of a police raid 5 UALA militants were killed and one policeman was injured, a weaponry cache was also recovered.

Between 8–17 July 2014, authorities detained 14 ASAK guerillas in the areas of Williamnagar, Soksan and Rongjeng, weapons, SIM cards, ammunition and demand notes were also seized.

On 28 August 2014, police recovered the bodies of 4 previously kidnapped, civilians, in the Oragitok village, West Garo Hills, Meghalaya.

On 13 September 2014, a shootout between members of GNLA and AMEF led to the death of 4 GNLA rebels, in the Bolmaram jungle, East Garo Hills.

On 24 September 2014, the heads of the ANVC rebel group and the ANVC Rimpu Marak splinter faction signed a peace accord with the government of Meghalaya. The agreement enhances the autonomy for the Garo Hills Autonomous District and includes financial aid, which will facilitate the socio-economic and educational development of the area. In return the rebels agreed to disband within the period of three months.

On 22 October 2014, security forces detained 6 ULFA rebels in the village of Pedaldoba, Tikrikilla, Menghalaya, six pistols, two grenades and 20 rounds of ammunition were also confiscated.

On 25 November 2014, authorities arrested ACAK commander William A Sangma along with a fellow guerrilla in the Tirupur district of Tamil Nadu.

On 7 December 2014, security forces uncovered an AMEF camp in the village of Papara Abri, East Garo Hills. Approximately 20 militants escaped into the jungle, as police seized explosives, radio sets, pistols and documentation.

On 18 December 2014, the Indian military killed two UALA fighters in the village of Thanti Pick Hills, Goalpara district, Assam.

On 16 February 2015, 4 Garo National Liberation Army and 2 ASAK cadres surrendered at an East Garo Hills police station, 5 weapons and over 100 rounds of ammunition were also transferred.

On 2 March 2015, a bomb blast wounded two petrol pump employees in the West Khasi Hills district, the owner of the pump had previously fallen victim of extortion attempts by GNLA militants.

On 5 March 2015, 10 members of the AMEF were nabbed in connection with illegal arms trade operations in the West and North Garo Hills.

On 10 March 2015, a joint ULFA – GNLA ambush resulted in the deaths of 4 policemen in Panda Reserve, Rongara, South Garo Hills, Menghalaya.

On 18 March 2015, the government of Meghalaya sanctioned the creation of a new counter insurgency battalion, known as Special Force 10, the unit will receive, riot management, jungle and urban warfare training.

On 18 February 2018, NCP candidate Jonathone N Sangma and his two security guards, and the driver were killed in an IED attack.

On 24 February 2018, Sohan D Shira, the Chief of Garo National Liberation Army (GNLA) killed in an encounter with Meghalaya Police's task force commando.

References

Conflicts in 1996
Civil wars involving the states and peoples of Asia
Insurgencies in Asia

Military history of India
Wars involving India
1990s conflicts
2000s conflicts
2020s conflicts
2000s in India
2010s conflicts
2010s in India